Chorsu (formerly Jaylghan or Jayilgan) is a village in northern central Tajikistan. It is part of the jamoat Lakhsh in Lakhsh District, one of the Districts of Republican Subordination. It lies near the river Kyzyl-Suu, a source river of the Vakhsh.

References

Populated places in Districts of Republican Subordination